Oberurmein is a small ski station situated at 1579 metres above sea level in the Heinzenberg-Domlschlag area, in Canton Graubünden, Switzerland.  It is politically attached to the town of Urmein, some 6 km away.

Ski areas and resorts in Switzerland